Robin Denuit (born 21 February 2002) is a Belgian professional footballer who plays as a centre-back.

References 

2002 births
Living people
Belgian footballers
Association football central defenders
R. Charleroi S.C. players
R.F.C. Seraing (1922) players